Urraca Mesa is a large mesa located in Colfax County in northern New Mexico, U.S., on the property of Philmont Scout Ranch. The mesa has a long history of mythical and supernatural associations, dating to the local indigenous tribes.

Name
The name comes from the Spanish word for magpie from ancient Native American legends.

Flora and fauna 
The mesa is covered in Ponderosa pine. Black bears, wild turkeys, deer and mountain lions are among its inhabitants.

Topography
Urraca Mesa is relatively flat with the exception of a protruding plateau, which contains a small intermittent spring at the base. It is known for having the highest number of lightning strikes anywhere in New Mexico.

References

Mesas of New Mexico
Philmont Scout Ranch
Landforms of Colfax County, New Mexico